"The Crunge" is a song by the English rock band Led Zeppelin from their 1973 album Houses of the Holy. The song is a takeoff on James Brown's style of funk similar to the group's attempt at reggae with "D'yer Mak'er". It was also released as the B-side of "D'yer Mak'er" in the US.

Composition and recording
The song evolved out of a jam session in the studio. John Bonham started the beat, John Paul Jones came in on bass, Jimmy Page played a funk guitar riff (and a chord sequence that he had been experimenting with since 1970), and Robert Plant started singing. For the recording, Page played a Fender Stratocaster guitar and it is possible to hear him depressing a whammy bar at the end of each phrase.

Reception
In a contemporary review for Houses of the Holy, Gordon Fletcher of Rolling Stone gave "The Crunge" a negative review, calling it a "naked imitation", along with "D'yer Mak'er", as well as "easily" one of the worst things the band has ever attempted. 

Fletcher added, "[It] reproduces James Brown so faithfully that it's every bit as boring, repetitive and clichéd as 'Good Foot'. Yakety-yak guitar, boom-boom bass, astoundingly idiotic lyrics ('when she walks, she walks, and when she talks, she talks') — it's all there. So is Jones' synthesizer, spinning absolutely superfluous electronic fills."

See also
List of cover versions of Led Zeppelin songs"The Crunge" entries

References

1973 songs
Led Zeppelin songs
1973 singles
Songs written by Jimmy Page
Songs written by John Bonham
Songs written by John Paul Jones (musician)
Songs written by Robert Plant
Song recordings produced by Jimmy Page
Atlantic Records singles